Admiral Dalindlela Muskwe (born 21 August 1998) is a Zimbabwean professional footballer who plays as a forward for League One club Fleetwood Town on loan from  Luton Town and the Zimbabwe national team.

Club career 
Muskwe signed for local team Leicester City at the age of nine in 2007. In May 2016 he was named the club's Academy Player of the Season, and one month later signed his first professional contract to keep him at the club until 2019.

On 28 January 2020, Muskwe joined Swindon Town on loan for the rest of the season.

His next loan was at Wycombe Wanderers, who he signed for on 5 January 2021. He made his debut for Wycombe in the FA Cup against Preston North End on 9 January 2021. On his league debut for Wycombe, against Brentford, he scored his first professional goal on 30 January 2021.

On 15 July 2021, Muskwe joined Championship side Luton Town for an undisclosed fee.

International career 
Muskwe represented the England national team at under-17 level, making his debut in the 2014 U17's Nordic Tournament. He scored 2 goals in 4 appearances in the tournament.

In November 2017 Muskwe made his senior international debut, appearing as a second-half substitute for Zimbabwe in a 1–0 defeat to Lesotho.

Personal life
Muskwe and his twin sister Adelaide were born in 1998 at Parirenyatwa Hospital in Harare, Zimbabwe. They moved to the United Kingdom when he was three. One source says that Muskwe was born and raised in England, and another says that he and his twin sister did not live in the UK until they were three.

Career statistics

Club

International

Scores and results list Zimbabwe's goal tally first, score column indicates score after each Muskwe goal.

Honours
Zimbabwe
COSAFA Cup bronze: 2019

References

External links
 
 Premier League Profile
 UEFA Youth League Profile

Living people
1998 births
Footballers from Leicester
Zimbabwean footballers
Zimbabwe international footballers
English footballers
England youth international footballers
Association football forwards
Leicester City F.C. players
Swindon Town F.C. players
Wycombe Wanderers F.C. players
Zimbabwean emigrants to the United Kingdom
Black British sportspeople
Zimbabwean expatriate sportspeople in England
2021 Africa Cup of Nations players